Eduardo dos Santos may refer to:

 José Eduardo dos Santos (born 1942), former President of Angola
 Eduardo dos Santos (footballer, born 1980), Brazilian football striker
 Eduardo dos Santos (footballer, born 1983), Argentine football forward
 Eduardo dos Santos Haesler (born 1999), German football goalkeeper